HIV/AIDS is considered the deadliest epidemic in the 21st century. It is transmitted through sex, intravenous drug use and mother-to-child transmission. Zambia is experiencing a generalized HIV/AIDS epidemic, with a national HIV prevalence rate of 11.3% among adults ages 15 to 49 as of 2018. Per the 2000 Zambian census, the people affected by HIV/AIDS constituted 15% of the total population, amounting to one million, of which 60%  were women. The pandemic results in increased number of orphans, with an estimated 600,000 orphans in the country. It was prevalent more in urban areas compared to rural and among all provinces, Copperbelt Province and Lusaka Province had higher occurrence.

The government of Zambia created an AIDS surveillance committee as early as 1986, and created an emergency plan to control the spread by 1987. By 2005, the government made antiretroviral therapy free for every individual. There are several UN and NGO voluntary organizations that are helping combat the disease.

Background

Human immunodeficiency virus infection and acquired immune deficiency syndrome (HIV/AIDS) is a set of conditions caused by infection with the human immunodeficiency virus (HIV). HIV is transmitted by three main ways: sexual contact, significant exposure to infected body fluids or tissues, and from mother to child during pregnancy, delivery, or breastfeeding (known as vertical transmission). There is no risk of acquiring HIV if exposed to feces, Nasal secretions, saliva, sputum, sweat, tears, urine, or vomit unless these are contaminated with blood. It is possible to be co-infected by more than one strain of HIV—a condition known as HIV superinfection.

Zambia is a landlocked, economically backward county in Africa. It is rated 166th in Human Development Index in 2006 out of a total of 177 countries based on the Human Development Report of the United Nations. By the end of 2006, a total of 39.5 million people in the world were infected by HIV and 2.9 million people died on account of ailments arising out of AIDS. Africa is the leader in AIDS with close to 60% of HIV victims and has been the leading cause of death in Africa.

Statistics
As per the 2000 Zambian census, the people affected by HIV or AIDS constituted 15 per cent of the population, amounting to one million, of which 60% estimated were women. The pandemic results in increased number of orphans, with an estimated 600,000 orphans in the country. It is estimated that by 2014, 974,000 children would be orphaned. The victims are high in Lusaka and Copperbelt provinces in spite of the provinces being the most urban. As per the estimate from 2006, the HIV positive cases is 5 per cent in the age group 15–19 years, 25 per cent from 30–34 years and 17% from 45–49 years. HIV was more prevalent in urban areas compared to rural areas.

Causes
The primary modes of HIV transmission are through sex, intravenous drug use and mother-to-child transmission. HIV prevalence rates vary considerably within the country. Infection rates are highest in cities and towns along major transportation routes and lower in rural areas with low population density. HIV prevalence among pregnant women can range from less than 10 percent in some areas to 30 percent in others. In general, however, young women ages 25 to 34 are at much higher risk of being infected by HIV than young men in the same age group. The prevalence rates are 12.7 and 3.8 percent, respectively. Risk for the disease is higher for people with sensory, intellectual, physical and psychosocial disabilities, despite the 2012 Persons with Disabilities Act. Other at-risk populations include military personnel, people in prostitution, truck drivers, and people who work in fisheries. Although men who have sex with men have a higher risk of HIV transmission than those who do not, the government-operated National AIDS Control Program does not address same-sex relationships. While Zambia's national prevalence rate remains high and shows no sign of declining, the country has been noted for its significant increases in antiretroviral treatment (ART) access.

Measures
The government of Zambia created an AIDS surveillance committee as early as 1986 and created an emergency plan to control the spread by 1987. As per the plan, all blood transfusion should be screened for HIV. By 2002, the government created a mission to make antiretroviral therapy available for every individual. By 2005, the government made antiretroviral therapy free for every individual.

With about one million Zambians living with HIV/AIDS and 200,000 of these persons requiring ART, the Government of the Republic of Zambia has prioritized making ART available to all Zambians in need. A 2006 rapid assessment of the Zambian ART program identified several important constraints including: inadequate human resources for counseling, testing, and treatment-related care; gaps in supply of drugs in the public sector; increase in value of the Zambian kwacha; lack of adequate logistic/supply chain systems; stigma that hinders people from seeking treatment and care; lack of information on the availability of treatment services; a high level of misinformation about ART; need for a continuous funding stream as an accumulation of patients on ART results in a growing need for support; high cost of ART to patients, despite subsidies from the public sector; lack of referral between counseling and testing services and ART; and lack of referral between home-based care services, testing and ART.

See also
ZAMBART Project

Notes

References

 f

Further reading
 Children as Caregivers: The Global Fight Against Tuberculosis and HIV in Zambia by Jean Hunleth, 2017, Rutgers University Press

Zambia
Zambia
Health in Zambia